Vinicio "Chico" García Uzcanga (December 24, 1924 – August 17. 2007) was a Mexican second baseman in Major League Baseball. He played for the Baltimore Orioles in the 1954 season. Listed at 5' 8", 170 lb., García batted and threw right-handed. He was born in Veracruz, Veracruz, Mexico. Outside of MLB, García enjoyed a distinguished baseball career that spanned five different decades as a player (1946–1970) and manager (1966–1984).

A solid infielder and contact hitter, García played nine Triple-A seasons in the Arizona-Texas and American Association leagues and one season in Cuban baseball, before serving as a backup infielder for the Orioles in the American League. He won four minor league batting titles in the Arizona-Texas League (1949), Mexican Gulf League (1950, 1951) and Mexican League (1963).

Following his playing career, García managed in Mexico from 1966 through 1984, winning four championship titles for Culiacán (1966–67, 1969–70), Guasave (1971–72) and Mochis (1983–84). He also managed the Monterrey, Veracruz, Sabinas, Jalisco, Monclova and Nuevo Laredo clubs. In 1981, he gained Mexican Baseball Hall of Fame honors.

Vinicio (Chico) Garcia was married to Carolyn Foshee (who died in 1995) and has two sons, Jerry Vinicio & David and also has two daughters, Becky & Carolyn Lee.

García died on August 16, 2007 in Monterrey, Nuevo León, Mexico at age 82.

Highlights
1949 - Led Arizona-Texas League in runs, hits, triples and batting average (.377).
1963 - At 38 age, won his second batting title in the Mexican League (.368) and hit a career-high 21 home runs.
His minor league career totals show a .306 average over 2,803 games.
As a second baseman for the Baltimore Orioles he played 39 games and his batting stats are: 62 AB, 6 R, 7 H, 2 3B, 5 RBI, 8 BB, 3 SO, 1 SF, 0.113 Avg., 0.211 OBP, 0.177 SLG.
Fielding stats: 245 G, 105 TC, 4.4 TC/G, 101 CH, 57 PO, 44 A, 4 E, 15 DP, 0.962 FLD %.
He coached the Mexican League team Sultanes de Monterrey for 260 games, reaching a winning percentage of .430 in three seasons.
The number he used with the Sultanes de Monterrey team from 1965-1965 & 1970 was retired on 06/11/1999.
He is the Sultanes player with most All-Star games played with this team (14).
He is the title second baseman in the All-Time players team of the Sultanes de Monterrey.
With the Sultanes de Monterrey 4 times was top scorer and 2B batter, three times leader in batting, two times in games played and hits batted and one time lead the team in times at bat and home runs.
Was inducted in the Mexico Hall of Fame of Baseball in 1981, the 14th Sultanes player in the Mexican HOF.

External links
Chico García - Baseballbiography.com

Retrosheet
Mexican Baseball Hall of Fame

1924 births
2007 deaths
Angeles de Puebla players
Baseball players from Veracruz
Baltimore Orioles players
Caribbean Series managers
Corpus Christi Aces players
Dallas Rangers players
Diablos Rojos del México players
Indianapolis Indians players
Indios de Ciudad Juárez (minor league) players
Major League Baseball players from Mexico
Major League Baseball second basemen
Mexican Baseball Hall of Fame inductees
Mexican expatriate baseball players in the United States
Mexican League baseball second basemen
Minor league baseball managers
Shreveport Sports players
Sultanes de Monterrey players
Tigres del México players
Toledo Sox players
Tuneros de San Luis Potosí players
Rojos del Águila de Veracruz players
Wichita Braves players